Doc Long may refer to:

George S. Long (1883–1958), U.S. Congressman (1953–1958) and member of the Long political dynasty from Louisiana
Clarence Long (1908–1994), U.S. Congressman (1963–1985) from Maryland